Victor Svendsen (born 2 August 1995) is a Danish badminton player. Svendsen has shown his talent as a badminton player since he was young. Trained at the Vendsyssel's talent department, he claimed the national U–13 elite team title and won the bronze medals in the singles and doubles event. In the national event, he previously played for Ikast, and now was part of the Vendsyssel Elite Badminton.

Career 
He reached the semifinals at the 2022 Korea Open. Because of his good results, he was selected to represent Danish team for the 2022 Thomas Cup and won a bronze medal.

Achievements

BWF International Challenge/Series (7 titles, 8 runners-up)
Men's singles 

  BWF International Challenge tournament
  BWF International Series tournament
  BWF Future Series tournament

References

External links 
 

1995 births
Living people
People from Hjørring
Sportspeople from the North Jutland Region
Danish male badminton players